Lamprosema victoriae is a moth in the family Crambidae. It was described by Harrison Gray Dyar Jr. in 1923. It has been recorded in the United States from Louisiana, Mississippi, Oklahoma and
Texas.

References

Moths described in 1923
Lamprosema
Moths of North America